The five hundred lei banknote is the highest of the circulating denomination of the Romanian leu. It is the same size as the 200 Euro banknote.

The main color of the banknote is gray. It pictures, on the obverse poet Mihai Eminescu, and on the reverse the University of Iași Library, and the front page of the Timpul newspaper.

History 
In the past, the denomination was also in the coin form, as follows:

First leu (1867-1947)
 banknote issues: 1877 (the hypothecary issue), 1916 (re-issues: 1917, 1918, 1919, 1920), 1924 (re-issue: 1925, 1926, 1927, 1930, 1931, 1932, 1933, 1934, 1938), 1934, 1936 (re-issues: 1939, 1940), 1940 (re-issues: 1941, 1942, 1943)
 coin issues: 1941 (anniversary edition), 1944
 banknote issue: 1944 (issued by the Red Army Comandament and circulated in 1944)
 coin issues: 1945, 1946

Second leu (1947-1952)
 banknote issues: 1947, 1949

Third leu - ROL (1952-2005)
 banknote issues: 1991, 1992
 coin issues: 1999 (re-issue: 2000), 2000 (anniversary edition)

Fourth leu - RON (since 2005)
 banknote issue: 2005

References 

National Bank of Romania website

Banknotes of Romania
Five-hundred-base-unit banknotes